The Jumhooree Party (Republican Party) is a political party in the Maldives. The party was founded by a group of MPs on 26 May 2008, and grew quickly, rapidly overtaking the Maldivian Democratic Party to become the largest opposition party in the Majlis for that year.

The party's leader and its presidential candidate is businessman and former finance minister Qasim Ibrahim.

References 

Political parties established in 2008
Islamic democratic political parties
Islamic political parties in the Maldives
2008 establishments in the Maldives